The Bowlus/Nelson BB-1 Dragonfly is an American, two seat, strut-braced, high-wing motor glider that was developed from the Bowlus BA-100 Baby Albatross glider by Hawley Bowlus.

Design and development
The development of the Dragonfly was sponsored by the Nelson Engine Company to promote the use of their H-44  four cylinder two-stroke engine. The engine was mounted in the rear of the fuselage pod, in pusher configuration, with the wooden two bladed  propeller below the metal tail boom. The fuel tank holds , enough for self-launching, but not for cross-country powered flight.

The Dragonfly shares the Baby Albatross's molded plywood fuselage pod, aluminium tube tail boom and strut-braced double spar wooden wing, covered in aircraft fabric aft of the spar. The leading edge is a plywood D-cell. The aircraft features dual controls and a retractable tricycle landing gear with a steerable nose wheel. The engine is started by a ratchet-wire recoil start system that allows restarts in flight, as well as on the ground.

Federal Aviation Administration certification of the type was achieved on 21 April 1947, with Nelson Aircraft Corporation as the certificate holder and the type officially known as Nelson Auxiliary Power Glider BB-1. The type certificate indicates that neither the engine nor the propeller need be certified. The type certificate specifies that the Nelson H-49 engine of  may also be installed.

The Dragonfly was later replaced in production by the improved Nelson Hummingbird PG-185B.

Operational history
In operational use the Nelson powerplant proved heavy and lacking in power and, as the Sailplane Directory terms it, "the result was an under-powered sailplane". As a result of the performance deficiencies only seven were produced.

In March 2011 there were still four BB-1s registered in the US, two of which had been transferred to the National Soaring Museum.

Aircraft on display
 Canadian Museum of Flight
 National Soaring Museum

Specifications (Dragonfly)

See also

References

1940s United States sailplanes
Bowlus aircraft
Nelson aircraft
Aircraft first flown in 1947
Motor gliders
Single-engined pusher aircraft